Gnorimoschema streliciella is a moth of the family Gelechiidae. It is locally distributed from central and northern Europe to the southern Ural Mountains and from Siberia and Mongolia to the Amur region and northern China.

The wingspan is 13–14 mm. Adults are on wing in June and July.

The larvae feed on Antennaria dioica. They mine the lower leaves of their host plant from within a silken tube made just below the surface of the ground.

Subspecies
Gnorimoschema streliciella streliciella
Gnorimoschema streliciella mongolorum Povolny, 1969

References

Moths described in 1854
Gnorimoschema
Moths of Europe